Ohlsson is a surname of Swedish origin. It is a contraction of the surname Olofsson and it literally means "son of Olof". Notable people with the name include:

Birgitta Ohlsson (born 1975), Swedish politician
Carina Ohlsson, Swedish politician
Erik Ohlsson (musician), Swedish guitarist
Erik Ohlsson (sport shooter), Swedish athlete
Garrick Ohlsson, American classical pianist
Hjalmar Ohlsson, Swedish athlete
Ingrid Ohlsson, Swedish orienteering competitor
Jenny Ohlsson, Swedish ambassador
Patrik Ohlsson, Swedish athlete
Peder Ohlsson, Swedish military officer
Per T. Ohlsson (1958-2021), Swedish journalist
Thomas Ohlsson (born 1958), Swedish sprint canoer
Thorild Ohlsson, Swedish athlete

Fictional
Greta Ohlsson, a character in Murder on the Orient Express by Agatha Christie

See also
Ohlson
Olsson

Patronymic surnames
Swedish-language surnames